Mexico News Daily is an English language news website about events in Mexico. In addition to its own staff, it gleans its information from Mexican newspapers and periodicals. Among its functions is providing content for newcomers to Mexico and expatriates.

It offers free content as well as a subscription service, and it features a free newsletter. It has a social media presence on Facebook, Twitter, and Instagram.

References

Mexican news websites